is a Japanese politician who serves as the Special Advisor to the Prime Minister for National Security Policy and Nuclear Disarmament Issues. A member of the Liberal Democratic Party, he previously served as Minister of Defense of Japan from September 2020 to August 2022. He is also a member of the House of Representatives, representing Yamaguchi’s 2nd District since 2012. He is the younger brother of former Japanese prime minister Shinzo Abe.

Early life
Nobuo is the third son of Shintaro Abe and Yoko Abe (née Kishi). He was born in Tokyo. Shortly after his birth, he was adopted by his maternal uncle, Seibu Oil chairman Nobukazu Kishi, who could not have children of his own. He did not know about his actual parentage, or his relationship with Shintaro Abe's other sons (Hironobu and Shinzo Abe), until he was preparing to enter university.

Kishi spent the first decade of his life living in Tokyo with his grandfather, former prime minister Nobusuke Kishi. He graduated from the Faculty of Economics at Keio University in 1981 and joined Sumitomo Corporation, where he worked until 2002. His postings included the United States, Vietnam, and Australia.

Political career

With his brother Abe's backing, Kishi was elected to the House of Councillors in 2004, representing Yamaguchi Prefecture. He became known as a specialist in security issues. He has served as Parliamentary Secretary for Defense (Fukuda and Aso Cabinet), Vice Chairman, LDP Diet Affairs Committee in the House of Councillors, Vice Chairman, Party Organization and Campaign Headquarters of LDP, Chairman, Special Committee on Okinawa and Northern Problems.

Abe government 
Kishi was elected to the House of Representatives in the 2012 Japanese general election after resigning from his House of Councillors seat. He re-took a seat in Yamaguchi Prefecture that had previously belonged to his grandfather Nobusuke Kishi and great-uncle Eisaku Sato, but that had been lost to the Democratic Party of Japan in the 2009 Japanese general election. Following the 2012 election, Kishi's brother Abe became Prime Minister. Kishi was promoted to Senior Vice Foreign Minister in 2013.

Kishi became known during this time for his role in promoting the Japan-Taiwan relationship. He helped to arrange an historic meeting between Prime Minister Abe and ROC opposition leader Tsai Ing-wen in 2015. After Tsai's reelection as president, Kishi met with Tsai in Taiwan in January 2020 and again in July 2020 (when he attended the funeral of President Lee Teng-hui).

In 2019, he publicly advocated for Japan acquiring strike capabilities as a defensive measure against North Korea, stating that Japan should not rely upon the United States for defense.

Suga and Kishida governments 

Kishi was appointed as Minister of Defense under Prime Minister Yoshihide Suga in September 2020. Commentator Michael Bosack described this as "a strange pick that signals factional influence and possibly a personal favor," and argued that the faction led by Hiroyuki Hosoda was clearly trying to build Kishi's credentials. Following the news of Kishi's appointment, a Chinese foreign ministry spokesman expressed hope that Japan would refrain from developing official ties with Taiwan.

In October 2020, Kishi released a joint statement with Australian Minister of Defense Linda Reynolds that announced that Japan's Self Defense Forces would be enabled to protect Australian military assets, an act which was made legal in September 2015 through the "Peace and Security Preservation Legislation" passed under the Abe administration. This makes Australia the second country (after the United States) whose assets Japan would be permitted to protect. Kishi and Reynolds also emphasized their opposition to "any destabilizing or coercive unilateral actions that could alter the status quo and increase tensions in the East China Sea," and some analysts have speculated this to be in reference to Chinese maritime activities around the Senkaku Islands. In a September 2021 interview with the Mainichi Shimbun, Kishi stated that Japan cannot stand aside when events occur in Taiwan due to being close neighbors and allies with shared universal values such as freedom and democracy.

After Suga's resignation as Prime Minister, his successor Fumio Kishida opted to retain Kishi as Defense minister after taking office in October 2021. Nikkei noted that this sent a message of continuity in Japan's policies toward China and Taiwan.

After the assassination of Shinzo Abe on 8 July 2022, Nobuo Kishi had to disclose that the relationship with the controversial Unification Church, also known as the "Moon Sect", extends to him and the help he received in past elections. Kishida replaced him as Defense Minister a month later. He announced plans to resign from the House of Representatives due to health issues, making way for a by-election on April 22nd, 2023.

Positions
Like his brother Shinzō, Kishi is affiliated to the openly revisionist lobby Nippon Kaigi, and a member of the following right-wing groups at the Diet:
Nippon Kaigi Diet discussion group (日本会議国会議員懇談会 - Nippon kaigi kokkai giin kondankai)
Conference of parliamentarians on the Shinto Association of Spiritual Leadership (神道政治連盟国会議員懇談会) - NB: SAS a.k.a. Sinseiren, Shinto Political League, Shinto Seiji Renmei Kokkai Giin Kondankai
Japan Rebirth (創生「日本」- Sosei Nippon)

Kishi gave the following answers to the questionnaire submitted by Mainichi to parliamentarians in 2012:
in favor of the revision of the Constitution
in favor of right of collective self-defense (revision of Article 9)
against the reform of the National assembly (unicameral instead of bicameral)
in favor of reactivating nuclear power plants
against the goal of zero nuclear power by 2030s
in favor of the relocation of Marine Corps Air Station Futenma (Okinawa)
against the evaluation of the purchase of Senkaku Islands by the Government
in favor of a strong attitude versus China
against the participation of Japan to the Trans-Pacific Partnership
in favor of considering a nuclear-armed Japan in the future (however, after his appointment as defense minister in 2020, he stated that this would "never happen")
against the reform of the Imperial Household that would allow women to retain their Imperial status even after marriage
In a March 2014 interview, he argued that nationalism was not on the rise in Japan, and that the Abe government would not change Japan's record of striving for peace as a member of international society.

Family

Grandfather: Kan Abe (politician), Nobusuke Kishi (bureaucrat, prime minister)
Adopted father (maternal uncle): Nobukazu Kishi (Seibu Oil Chairman Nobusuke Kishi's eldest son)
Adoptive mother (aunt-in-law): Nakako (Yamaguchi Prefectural Assembly Chairman Joji Tanabe )
Biological father: Shintaro Abe (Foreign Minister)
Biological mother: Yoko Abe (Nobusuke Kishi's eldest daughter)
Great uncle: Eisaku Sato (Prime Minister)
Eldest brother: Hironobu Abe
Second brother: Shinzo Abe
Eldest son: Nobuyoshi Kishi (former Fuji TV reporter, secretary after becoming a minister)

References

External links 

  in Japanese.

|-

1959 births
Living people
Politicians from Tokyo
Keio University alumni
Members of Nippon Kaigi
Members of the House of Councillors (Japan)
Liberal Democratic Party (Japan) politicians
Shinzo Abe
Japanese defense ministers